Burqin may refer to:

China
Burqin County, a county in Xinjiang
 (布尔津镇), a town and the seat of Burqin County
 (布尔津河), in Xinjiang

Palestine
 Burqin, Palestine
 Burqin Church

See also
 Burkin